Somebody New is the second studio album by American country music artist Rhett Akins. The album was released by Decca Nashville on June 4, 1996. Four singles were released from the album, including Akins' only number 1 single, "Don't Get Me Started", the number 38 "Love You Back" (his final Top 40 hit), as well as "Every Cowboy's Dream" and the title track.

"K-I-S-S-I-N-G" was previously released by co-writer Shawn Camp on his 1993 self-titled debut.

Track listing

Personnel
Compiled from liner notes.

Musicians
 Rhett Akins — lead vocals 
 Mike Brignardello — bass guitar
 Larry Byrom — acoustic guitar
 Glen Duncan — fiddle, mandolin
 Stuart Duncan — fiddle, mandolin
 Paul Franklin — steel guitar
 Sonny Garrish — steel guitar
 Carl Gorodetzky — concertmaster
 Jennifer Hanson — background vocals
 Dann Huff — electric guitar, gut string guitar
 Liana Manis — background vocals
 Brent Mason — electric guitar
 Steve Nathan — keyboards
 Mac McAnally — acoustic guitar
 The Nashville String Machine — strings
 Tom Roady — percussion
 Matt Rollings — keyboards
 Brent Rowan — electric guitar
 John Wesley Ryles — background vocals
 Harry Stinson — background vocals
 Bergen White — string arrangements
 Dennis Wilson — background vocals
 Lonnie Wilson — drums
 Curtis Young — background vocals

Technical
 Chuck Ainlay — mixing
 Robert Charles — overdubbing
 John Hampton — mixing
 Warren Peterson — overdubbing
 Steve Tillisch — recording
 Hank Williams — mastering, digital editing
Mark Wright — production

Chart performance

References

1996 albums
Rhett Akins albums
Decca Records albums
Albums produced by Mark Wright (record producer)